Gargar Bridge-Dam, is a world heritage site, a part of Shushtar Historical Hydraulic System, located in the island city Shushtar, Khouzestan, Iran. It  was registered on UNESCO's list of World Heritage Sites in 2009 and is Iran's 10th cultural heritage site to be registered on the United Nations' list together with the 12 other historical bridges, dams, canals, and buildings as Shushtar Historical Hydraulic System. The bridge-dam is built on Gargar River, adjacent to Shushtar watermills and waterfalls complex.

Sources 

Water supply and sanitation in Iran
Buildings and structures in Khuzestan Province
Tourist attractions in Khuzestan Province
Dams in Khuzestan Province
Bridges in Iran